is a Japanese video game developer. It was founded in December 2006. Koichi Ishii, known for his work on the Mana series of games by Square Enix, was hired as CEO and president of the company in April 2007. The company's name comes from the Italian phrase "diamante grezzo", meaning "a diamond in the rough".

Games

References

External links
 

Amusement companies of Japan
Video game companies of Japan
Video game development companies
Nintendo divisions and subsidiaries
Video game companies established in 2006
Japanese companies established in 2006
Software companies based in Tokyo